Fort Normandeau is a historical site marking the birthplace of Red Deer, Alberta. It was occupied by the 65th Battalion, Mount Royal Rifles, in 1885 during the North-West Rebellion. The fort is situated near the Red Deer Crossing along the Red Deer River.

History
Originally the river crossing was used by buffalo, deer, elk and other wildlife, later by First Nations Peoples that would follow the migrating buffalo, later still the fur traders, and settlers.

The city of Red Deer sits about 5 kilometres to the east from the current site of the reconstructed fort. The original location of the fort was about half a kilometre to the west on what is now the Border Paving property. 

The Calgary and Edmonton Railway (C&E) line was originally planned to go through next to the original fort site. However Leonard Gaetz offered half his land to the C&E to run through what is now downtown Red Deer. Red Deer grew up around the C&E station. Today the population of Red Deer is approximately 110,000 people.

The crossing was used by North-West Mounted Police until 1893 when it was abandoned.

External links
Historic Fort Normandeau - museum site
http://www.waskasoopark.ca/Historic-Fort-Normandeau.html

North-West Mounted Police forts
1885 establishments in the Northwest Territories
Museums in Alberta
Living museums in Canada
Buildings and structures in Red Deer, Alberta